Inclusiveness and exclusivity in Ayyavazhi is the inclusive and exclusive ideology of Ayyavazhi scriptures over other religions. The formula of inclusivism and exclusivism was applied in the religio-cultural universe of Ayyavazhi is one that is not found anywhere else in the world. Though there are separate verses towards inclusivism and exclusivism as central themes in Akilam, the mixture of both is unique. The inclusivistic theory of accepting the views of different religions for a certain period of time and from then onwards exclusivistically rejecting all of them by narrating that all the previous had lost their substances is a mythical as well as religious break-through.

View on gods
Ayyavazhi accepts all God heads of several religions such as the concept of Allah and almost all God-heads in Hinduism. The Vaishnavite concept of Maha Vishnu is often referred to in Ayyavazhi scriptures. It also includes the avatars of Narasimha, Rama, Krishna etc. Also, many quotes in Akilam give space for glorifying the activities and discussions of Vishnu. More over Vaikundar is said to be son of Narayana. The Saivite concept of Parasiva, The Trimurthi conception, all found place here. It also says that Siva is the supreme head of all the Deva Sanga. It also includes many events about the Tamil God Muruga. But unlike in Hinduism, Muruga is considered as one among the six primary Avatars of Vishnu. Akilam refer to Vaikundar as Thanumal Vethan, which means Vaikundar himself is Siva Vishnu and Brahma. In midst of the meta-narrative mythography it also refers to Ganapathi, Indra, Varuna, Vayu, etc. It too refers to female god-heads such as Lakshmi, Sarasvati, Parvati, Kali, Saptha Kannis, etc. All the God-heads are treated with similar powers as referred in Hindu scriptures. All this divine powers (god-heads) are viewed as the lesser manifestation of one and supreme power Ekam. 

But due to the advent of Kaliyan and because of the cruel nature of his boons, for the first time the supreme God or the 'God beyond Consciousness' (Ekan) incarnates in the world as Vaikundar and so all the God-heads were surrendered to Vaikundar and all the previous scriptures had lost their substances. And so for the Kaliyukam, Vaikundar was said to be the only worshipable God and hence, the theology of Ayyavazhi was channeled towards exclusivism. 

Apart from this it also refers to some God-heads from Abrahamic traditions. It says that Narayana, who is one among the three power-head in Ayyavazhi Trinity was the one who incarnates as Christ. Quotes from Akilam and Arul Nool refers to the Islamic conception of 'Allah', also. 

By all these, Akilam reveals an inclusive character of God. It don't rejects any religion's views on focussing the God. A quote in Akilam refers Vaikundar as, "You moves around the world in various forms".  So, it says that one and the single god is worshipped in different names all over the world.

View on scriptures
The manner in which Akilathirattu Ammanai treats the scriptures of different religions is complicated when compared to its view on God-heads. While it refers to Vedas, Shastras, Agamas and Puranas extensively, it says that this scriptures had lost their substances at two stages. One at the advent of Kaliyan in this world and then during the incarnation of Vaikundar. 

During the advent of Kaliyan he bought the powers of various Hindu scriptures including Vedas as boon from Siva, who was the ultimate power and the supreme of Deva Sanga. He also bought the form of Brahmin as boon. He also added several additions to the true scriptures. By this the scriptures and its powers are controlled by Kaliyan. So the divine Knowledge couldn't be achieved through that 'Kali-affected scriptures'. Then during the incarnation of Vaikundar the ruling-power of deva Sanga is shifted from Siva to Vishnu and then Vishnu to Vaikundar, since Vaikundar is  the incarnation of the Supreme Ekam. Since for the first time the 'God beyond consciousness' incarnated in the world, the universal power vested with Vaikundar and so the supremacy. So no God to be worshipped other than Vaikundar since then. Also, since all the previous scriptures lost their substances new scriptures which are unaffected to Kali is given by God to the world and that is Akilam. But on the other hand the scriptures other than that of Dharmic conceptions are completely rejected by Akilam, though the god-heads on those scriptures are accepted.

While Kalineesan arrested Vaikundar and proceeded towards Thiruvananthapuram, the situation of Vaikundar was narrated as, "As once on the non-liberative Cross, suffered the beatings of thorns, dead and reanimates for uplifting the poor, for this yuga here, he suffer this for the liberation of the downtrodden." Akilam 13:227-231. By this it means that Vaikundar was the one who incarnates as Jesus and so by this verse Akilam accepts Christ. But it did not recognise The Bible. Thus, a quote in Vinchai about Venneesan reads, "He created a Veda (scripture) of his own intention". Also about Kaliyan it says about Bible that, "There will be a religion of him which tells the world to treat greatly, the Cross." Akilam 10:244 Likewise, Akilam accepts that the term 'Allah' and views it in relation to 'Ekam' (the supreme power). But it rejects the religion of Islam and its ideas. A quote reads, "There will be another which make a call to the world to put upon caps." Akilam 10:243
 
Ayyavazhi accepts the incarnation of Rama and Krishna but seems that it rejects the Ramayana and the Mahabharata as there is no mention of these. It accepts only the four Vedas as the 'Books of Perfection'. However, this view of the Vedas is not inconsistent with Hinduism's views nor is different. In Hinduism, the Vedas are viewed as Śruti, or primary scripture, while other scriptures such as Ramayana are viewed as Smriti or secondary scripture. But later, Kaliyan had bought the Vedas as boon and so the Vedas had lost their substance by the advent of Kaliyan. It also says that he (Kaliyan) had performed several additions and had hidden several contents of them. And hence God incarnated as Vaikundar. So for the present age, Akilathirattu Ammanai is the only 'Book of Perfection'.

Ultimate exclusivism
According to Akilathirattu, the Vedas are the only religious text to be followed and all others were mere incarnations of God and thus, the religion based ideas based on such beliefs were created by the intention of man but not of God. But since now, the Vedas were destroyed by Kaliyan, for the present age, Akilam, which describes the incarnation of the Supreme God, Ekam is the only 'Book of Perfection'. By this Ayyavazhi rejects all other scriptures and follows only Akilathirattu Ammanai.

See also
 Ayyavazhi
 Ayya Vaikundar
Akilathirattu Ammanai

References
 G. Patrick, Religion and Sub-altern Agency, University of Madras, 2003.
 R. Ponnu, Vaikunda Swamigal Ore Avataram, Ram Publishers, 2002.
 Tha. Krishna Nathan, Ayya Vaikundarin Vazvum Vazhibadum, Thinai Veliyeettagam, 2000.
 R. Ponnu, Sri Vaikunda Swamigal and Struggle for Social Equality in South India, Madurai Kamaraj University, 2000.
Akilattirattu Ammanai

Akilattirattu Ammanai